Chad Warner (born 19 May 2001) is an Australian rules footballer who plays for the Sydney Swans in the Australian Football League (AFL). He was recruited by the Sydney Swans with the 39th draft pick in the 2019 AFL draft.

Early football
Warner played for the Willetton Junior Football Club in his home suburb of Willetton in Western Australia. He played for East Fremantle in the Western Australian Football League colts division for the 2019 season, playing 9 games and kicking 8 goals. He also represented Western Australia in the AFL Under 18 Championships. He also played football for his school Aquinas College, Perth in the Public Schools Association.

His father Travis Warner, and grandfather Graeme Warner, both played football for the Nhill Football Club in the Wimmera Football League. Travis moved to Perth in the late 1990s to play for South Fremantle in the West Australian Football League (WAFL), playing 34 games in three seasons.

AFL career

Debut Seasons (2020-2021)
Warner debuted in the Swans' eight point loss to the Richmond Tigers in the 6th round of the 2020 AFL season, alongside teammate Dylan Stephens. On his debut, Warner picked up 8 disposals, 2 marks and 2 tackles.

After a great start to the 2021 AFL season, Warner received a 2021 AFL Rising Star nomination after he kicked 2 goals, collected 20 disposals and had 417 metres gained in a career best performance against  in Round 3. He re-signed with the club the day he received his nomination, keeping him at the club until 2023.  The following week saw him named as one of the Swans' best after he collected 23 disposals, his highest total in a game to that point.

In 2021 Warner missed Round 13 due to leg soreness.

Rise (2022) 
Warner started the 2022 season by missing the opening round with COVID-19 but he played the next game and was the one who kicked the ball to Lance Franklin when he kicked his 1000th goal. He then enjoyed a breakout 2022 season with his incredible burst and impact per touch immediately marking him as one of the best young players of the competition. AFL journalist Damian Barrett spoke many times about the high esteem he places him in, even counting him a certainty to win the Brownlow at some stage. His incredible season was awarded when he was included in the All Australian Squad and was the runner-up in the Bob Skilton Medal. He was the clear best on ground for the Swans in their grand final loss. Heading into the 2023 season he is one of the favourites to win the Brownlow Medal.

Statistics
Updated to the end of the 2022 season.

|-
| 2020 ||  || 1
| 2 || 0 || 0 || 9 || 5 || 14 || 3 || 3 || 0.0 || 0.0 || 4.5 || 2.5 || 7.0 || 1.5 || 1.5 || 0
|-
| 2021 ||  || 1
| 13 || 8 || 5 || 135 || 81 || 216 || 31 || 48 || 0.6 || 0.3 || 10.3 || 6.2 || 16.6 || 2.3 || 3.6 || 1
|-
| 2022 ||  || 1
| 24 || 20 || 24 || 327 || 220 || 547 || 80 || 97 || 0.8 || 1.0 || 13.6 || 9.2 || 22.8 || 3.3 || 4.0 || 12
|- class=sortbottom
! colspan=3 | Career
! 39 !! 28 !! 29 !! 471 !! 306 !! 777 !! 114 !! 148 !! 0.7 !! 0.7 !! 12.1 !! 7.8 !! 19.9 !! 2.9 !! 3.8 !! 13
|}

Honours and achievements
Individual
 AFL Rising Star nominee: 2021 (round 3)

References

External links
 
 
 

2001 births
Living people
Sydney Swans players
Australian rules footballers from Western Australia
East Fremantle Football Club players